The London Pneumatic Despatch Company (also known as the London Pneumatic Dispatch Company) was formed on 30 June 1859, to design, build and operate an underground railway system for the carrying of mail, parcels and light freight between locations in London. The system was used between 1863 and 1874.

Background

Sir Rowland Hill of the General Post Office commissioned two engineers to investigate the feasibility of a pneumatic tube-based system between the General Post Office and the West District Central Post Office. In 1855 and 1856 they reported favourably but there would be significant cost. The scheme was not progressed.

In 1859 Thomas Webster Rammell and Josiah Latimer Clark proposed an underground tube network in central London "for the more speedy and convenient circulation of despatches and parcels".

The company was founded in 1859 with offices at 6 Victoria Street, Westminster. Capital of £150,000 was sought through 15,000 shares at £10 each. The company's directors were its chairman Richard Temple-Grenville, 3rd Duke of Buckingham and Chandos, deputy chairman Mark Huish, Thomas Brassey, Edwin Clark, the Hon. William Napier, John Horatio Lloyd, William Henry Smith and Sir Charles Henry John Rich.

With initial funding of £25,000 (£ in ), the company tested the technology and constructed a pilot route at the Soho Foundry of Boulton and Watt in Birmingham. The first full-scale trial was at Battersea during the summer of 1861. A single tube was installed, 452 yards long, with curves of up to  radius and gradients of up to 1 in 22.  narrow gauge track was cast inside the tube. Wheeled capsules were fitted with vulcanised rubber flaps to make an air seal. Power was provided by a 30 horse-power steam engine with a  diameter fan. Single capsules weighed up to 3 tonnes, and achieved speeds up to 40 mph (60 km/h).

Operation

A permanent line of  narrow gauge was constructed between Euston railway station and the North West District Post Office in Eversholt Street, a distance of approximately a third of a mile. The line was tested from 15 January 1863, and operation started on 20 February 1863. A capsule conveying up to 35 bags of mail could make the short journey between terminals in one minute. Thirteen journeys were operated each day, with a daily operating cost of £1 4s 5d. The Post Office was charged a nominal fee for use of the service, presumably to encourage them to accept the technology.

A journalist made a report on the first scheme at Euston:

The company sought to develop further lines within London, and attempted to raise an additional £125,000 (£ in ), of capital. The prospectus proposed a network of lines between "points so important that it is unnecessary to dwell upon the magnitude of the traffic that must naturally arise between them". The first line was to have been a route linking the Camden Town and Euston (Square) stations of the London and North Western Railway.

Work started on a  narrow gauge line from Euston to Holborn in September 1863. The tubes were constructed by the Staveley Coal and Iron Company. The first 'trains' ran on 10 October 1865 after a demonstration in which the chairman, Richard Temple-Grenville, 3rd Duke of Buckingham and Chandos, travelled from Holborn to Euston in one of the capsules.

Another line from Holborn to Gresham Street via the General Post Office on St Martin's le Grand was under construction in 1865. By the time of the 1866 financial crisis caused by the Overend, Gurney and Company collapse, a ⅜ mile tube from Holborn to Hatton Garden had been constructed. Total expenditure so far was £150,000 (£ in ).

Construction restarted in 1868, and it was completed to St. Martin's le Grand (for the General Post Office) in 1869. Capsules from the General Post Office reached Newgate Street within 17 minutes, at speeds of up to 60 mph.

The Post Office made several trials of the system, but there were not substantial time savings to be made, and by 1874, the Post Office abandoned its use, and the company went into liquidation in 1875. The Edinburgh Evening News reported in 1876 that the trucks containing the parcels continually stuck in the tunnels, and this was the reason for the failure of the company.

In late 1921, an agreement was reached between the Pneumatic Despatch Company and the Postmaster General for the sale (for £7,500) of the remaining infrastructure of "the tube" to the Postmaster General. The agreement recognised that "the Company has not for many years past worked the tube and the same is not now in working order" and that various persons had made unauthorised breaches in the tube as originally constructed.  The agreement was confirmed by the Post Office (Pneumatic Tubes) Act 1922, which also repealed enactments from 1859, 1864 and 1872 authorising the company.

Artifacts

Two of the original vehicles survive, having been recovered in 1930, one in the Museum of London and the other in the National Railway Museum at York.

See also

London Post Office Railway

References

External links
 London’s Lost Pneumatic Railway: The World’s 2nd Oldest Underground
 London's Victorian Hyperloop

Pneumatics
Pipeline transport
Postal system of the United Kingdom
Postal history of the United Kingdom
London Post Office Railway
Industrial railways in England
Subterranean London
History of rail transport in London
2 ft gauge railways in England
British companies established in 1859
British companies disestablished in 1875
1859 establishments in England
Railway companies established in 1859
Railway companies disestablished in 1875